Dounan is a railway station on the Taiwan Railways Administration (TRA) West Coast line located in Dounan Township, Yunlin County, Taiwan.

History
The station was opened on 15 December 1903.

Architecture
The station was built with a mix of Japanese and Western-style architecture.

Around the station 
 Honey Museum

See also
 List of railway stations in Taiwan

References

External links 

1903 establishments in Taiwan
Railway stations in Yunlin County
Railway stations opened in 1903
Railway stations served by Taiwan Railways Administration